DEPC can refer to:

 Diethylpyrocarbonate, a chemical used in the laboratory to inactivate RNAse enzymes
 1,2-Erucoyl-sn-Glycero-3-phosphocholine, a phospholipid